Budhial is a village and union council of Talagang District in the Punjab Province of Pakistan. Budhial village is located about  SW from Talagang.

History 
Budhial is located on Talagang- Multan Khurd Highway. It is linked to CPEC through Tarap Interchange. it is located at distance of 22 km from Tarap Interchange. 
Budhial as a settled town has existed since 1500 AD.

Demographic 
It has approximate population of 7000 people. Most of Budhial's population are different clans of the Awans including Phirwal, Phatial and Musbal. Phirwal is the largest clan of the area.

Infrastructure 
Budhial is one of the developed villages of the area with very high rate of literacy  and center of Rihan Region / Budhial union council. It has electricity, natural gas, land line telephones, internet  facilities.

Hotels
Budhial is famous for various hotels it has. Shan-E- Awan, Angara are few of these.

Surrounding Areas 
Other villages near Budhial are Patwali, Misrial and Tamman. Budhial has separate high schools for both boys and girls, a madrassah for boys and a madrassah for girls where girls and boys from Budhial and nearby villages are getting education.

Health 
Budhial has Basic Health Unit and various private medical clinics. a veterinary hospital exists for household animals.

Professions 
Joining military service is most common and traditional profession.  Agriculture farming is other common profession.

Population Trends
Large number of families have settled to nearby towns of Rawalpindi , Islamabad for better education, health and job opportunities.

Sports  
Sports played in Budhial include Gulli danda, Pithu garm, Chuppan Chuppai, Kabbadi, Cricket and Shooting Ball (a local variant of volleyball).

Picnic / Tourism 
The landscape of Budhial is really beautiful and a stream flows near the village which is known as Ankar.

Ankar once used to be a useful water resource but with the advent and introduction of technology, it is not used for this purpose anymore. 
Village has two water ponds known as Ban and Chapur.
a beautiful cave complex Anhara Dobak is also located nearby.

Shrines 
There is a mausoleum of Bibi Rabia near main graveyard of Budhial. Bibi Rabia is very famous Wali (Sufi). People from village and nearby villages visit her mausoleum daily. Village also has post office, basic health center & veterinary hospital.

Famous Persons 
The village is the hometown of Captain Muhammad Nawaz two times Asian Champion in javelin throw and A Pride of Performance Award Winner. A gate of Liaquat Gymnasium Islamabad has been named after him as Nawaz Gate.

Public Demands 
there is requirement to establish a college in the town.

Education 
Budhial has a government high school with separate campuses for boys and girls.

References

Union councils of Chakwal District
Populated places in Chakwal District